Romildo Santos Rosa (born October 25, 1973), known as Romildo, is a former Brazilian football player.

Club statistics

References

External links

1973 births
Living people
Brazilian footballers
J1 League players
Nagoya Grampus players
Brazilian expatriate footballers
Expatriate footballers in Japan
Association football defenders